From January to March 2017, various weather forecast offices of the National Weather Service confirmed at least 399 tornadoes across the United States, activity well beyond climatological norms. Based on the 1991–2010 average, the first month of the year is expected to see 35 tornadoes, with 29 occurring in February and 80 forming throughout March. In 2017, however, the count for the first three months was 135, 70, and 194, respectively. Activity began with the development of an EF1 tornado north of Jasper, Texas at 15:03 UTC on January 2. The latest storm of the period was an EF1 that touched down southeast of Powellsville, North Carolina at 22:15 UTC on March 31. The strongest tornado, an EF4, carved a path of destruction from Perryville, Missouri to southwest of Christopher, Illinois. Meanwhile, the deadliest tornado of the period was of EF3 intensity that destroyed a mobile home park south of Adel, Georgia, killing 11 people.

The first month of the year featured the second-highest tornado count on record, surpassed only by 1999. A total of 135 tornadoes were confirmed, resultant from two major outbreaks that affected the United States on January 2 and from January 21–23. The latter event was the second-largest January outbreak on record (with 81 confirmed tornadoes), second to January 21–23, 1999, and the third-largest wintertime outbreak, excelled only by the aforementioned incident and the 2008 Super Tuesday tornado outbreak. In addition, the outbreak led to 42 tornadoes in the state of Georgia, upending the previous record of 25 set during 2004's Hurricane Ivan. Twenty people were killed from January 21–23, the second-highest count during a January event to the 1969 Hazlehurst, Mississippi tornado outbreak. February, meanwhile, featured 70 tornadoes, a count well below that of the preceding month's but still over twice the long-term average. An outbreak on the final day of February into the first day of March produced 72 tornadoes and 4 fatalities. On the back of that outbreak, an event of 63 tornadoes across similar areas a week later, and continued activity in the weeks following, March observed a total of 194 tornadoes.

United States yearly total

January

January 2 event

January 7 event

January 9 event

January 11 event

January 13 event

January 15 event

January 16 event

January 18 event

January 19 event

January 21 event

January 22 event

January 23 event

February

February 7 event

February 9 event

February 14 event

February 15 event

February 19 event

February 20 event

February 25 event

February 28 event

March

March 1 event

March 5 event

March 6 event

March 7 event

March 9 event

March 11 event

March 13 event

March 14 event

March 19 event

March 21 event

March 23 event

March 24 event

March 25 event

March 26 event

March 27 event

March 28 event

March 29 event

March 30 event

March 31 event

See also
 Tornadoes of 2017
 List of United States tornadoes from September to December 2016
 List of United States tornadoes in April 2017

Notes

References

2017 natural disasters in the United States
2017-related lists
Tornadoes of 2017
Tornadoes
Tornadoes
March 2017 events in the United States
2017, 01